The 1980 Dwars door België was the 35th edition of the Dwars door Vlaanderen cycle race and was held on 23 March 1980. The race started and finished in Waregem. The race was won by Johan van der Meer.

General classification

References

1980
1980 in road cycling
1980 in Belgian sport